Bojana Vunturišević (born 6 March 1985) is Serbian singer-songwriter. Born in Požarevac and raised in Kostolac, she rose to prominence as the lead singer of the band Svi na pod!. In 2015, Vunutrišević began her solo career and has released two albums: Daljine (2017) and Ljubav (2023).

Career
Vunturišević began her professional music career as a member of underground bands The Root, Out and MistakeMistake. She gained popularity as member of the indie-pop band Svi na pod!. After releasing two albums with the band: Prvi (2011) and Mladost (2014), Vunturišević decided to pursue a solo career in 2015. 

On 21 April 2017, Vunturišević released her critically acclaimed debut solo album Daljine under Mascom Records. It was preceded by the single "Kese, etikete". As a part of her album tour, she held a concert at the Belgrade Youth Center on 19 May 2018. In June the following year, Vunturišević began her collaboration with Bassivity Digital through which she released "Promašaj". The single was subsequently taken off music platforms alongside "Mili mili" by Sara Jo, which was written by Vunturišević, by the company Tim Drum Music (TDM). Two months later, she made a statement that TDM, which was supposed to represent her copyright, was negligent of her music and also censored her work outside Mascom Records, whom the company is associated with. Due to legal issues, Vunturišević took a hiatus from releasing music until she reached a settlement with TDM in 2020.

In September 2022, Vunturišević performed in Tašmajdan Hall during the EuroPride manifestation, hosted by Belgrade. On 11 February 2023, she released her second album Ljubav under Bassivity Digital. It produced two singles: "Money" (2021) and the title track (2022).

Personal life
In 2014, Vunturišević started her own children's choir, named DFhor. In 2015, she graduated from the Faculty of Musical Arts at the University of Belgrade with a degree in music pedagogy.

She has a son, born in 2016, with director Ivan Stojiljković.

Artistry
Vunturišević describes her musical style as "capitalist blues", which originated from the review of her song "Kese, etikete" by Serbian music publicist and critic Žikica Simić. Her music draws influences from indie pop, trip hop and dancehall. In addition to her own recording career, Vunturišević has written songs for other prominent artists in the regional industry, such as Nataša Bekvalac, Sara Jo, Franka and Senidah.

Discography
Studio albums
Daljine (2017)
Ljubav (2023)

Awards and nominations

References

External links

Serbian pop singers
21st-century Serbian women singers
Living people
1985 births
Musicians from Požarevac